Danny Pearman (born February 7, 1965) is an American college football assistant coach at Clemson University, serving as the director of scouting under head coach Dabo Swinney.

Playing career
Pearman played college football at Clemson University under Head Coach Danny Ford.  He would letter at Tight End for the 1985-1987 seasons.  During his playing years he would help Clemson to Atlantic Coast Conference Titles in 1986 and 1987.

Coaching career
Pearman started his coaching career as a graduate assistant on the Tigers' 1988 ACC championship team.  Since then, he has served on coaching staffs at Alabama, Virginia Tech, North Carolina, Duke, and Maryland before returning to Clemson in 2009 as special teams coordinator, as well as the offensive tackles and tight ends coach.

Personal life
Pearman graduated with a bachelor's degree in finance from Clemson University in 1987 and completed his master of business administration from Clemson in 1989.  He is married and has one daughter (Taylor) and two sons (Tanner, Trent) with his wife Kristy.

References

External links
 Clemson profile

1965 births
Living people
Alabama Crimson Tide football coaches
American football tight ends
Clemson Tigers football players
Clemson Tigers football coaches
Duke Blue Devils football coaches
Maryland Terrapins football coaches
North Carolina Tar Heels football coaches
Players of American football from Charlotte, North Carolina
Sportspeople from Charlotte, North Carolina
Virginia Tech Hokies football coaches